Elizabeth Chamberlain  may refer to:

Elizabeth Carey, Lady Berkeley (1576–1635), second married name Elizabeth Chamberlain
Elizabeth Chamberlain Gibson (1830–1916), née Elizabeth Chamberlain

See also
Beth Chamberlin, actress